Stickup Kid is an American Rock band from San Jose, California that formed in January 2009. The band consists of vocalist Tony Geravesh, guitarist Bo McDowell, bassist Jonathan McMaster, drummer Cameron MacBain, and guitarist Curtis Wallace. They have released three EP's, Fight Nothing (2009), Nothing About Me (2012), Debris (2016) and three full-length albums The Sincerest Form of Flattery (2011), Future Fire (2013), Soul Drive (2019). Stickup Kid were signed to Warner Music Group's Adeline Records, who distributed both Nothing About Me and Future Fire. Following Adeline Records' closure in 2017, the band self-released 2019's "Soul Drive" and is currently in the studio.

Discography
Studio albums
 The Sincerest Form of Flattery (2011)
 Future Fire (2013)
 Soul Drive (2019)

References 

Adeline Records artists
Musical groups established in 2009
Pop punk groups from California